Georgios Bouzoukis (born 26 July 1993) is a Greek professional footballer who plays as a midfielder for Bulgarian club Lokomotiv Sofia.

Career
Bouzoukis started his professional career in Vataniakos as he debuted in 2013–14 championship of Football League on 21 February 2014 in a 0–0 home draw against Serres. On 30 June 2014 his contract with Vataniakos was expired and he signed a contract on 18 July 2014 with Pierikos. Bouzoukis was released on a free transfer on 30 June 2015 as his team was relegated to Football League 2. He was approached by Superleague Greece side Veria and he eventually signed a three-year contract with the club. On 7 August 2015 and as the club had returned from their main stage of pre-season preparation in Arnhem, it was decided that Bouzoukis would move on a loan to Chania in order to gain more experience at professional level.

References

External links
 

1993 births
Living people
Greek footballers
Veria F.C. players
Pierikos F.C. players
FC Lokomotiv 1929 Sofia players
Greek expatriate footballers
Greek expatriate sportspeople in Bulgaria
Expatriate footballers in Bulgaria
Footballers from Katerini
Association football midfielders